Wilbert Jones (born February 27, 1947) is an American former professional basketball player.

Career
A 6'8" forward born in McGehee, Arkansas, and played college basketball at Albany State University, he was named a Little All-American by UPI for the 1968–69 season, as the Golden Rams won their third consecutive Southeastern Athletic Conference regular season title. Jones was drafted in the fifth round of the 1969 NBA draft by the Los Angeles Lakers and by the Miami Floridians in the 1969 ABA Draft.

Jones played seven seasons (1969–1976) in the American Basketball Association as a member of the Miami Floridians, Memphis Pros/Tams and Kentucky Colonels.

After the ABA–NBA merger in 1976 Jones was selected by the Indiana Pacers in the ABA Dispersal Draft and played two seasons (1976–1978) in the National Basketball Association for the Indiana Pacers and Buffalo Braves.

Jones won the 1975 ABA Championship with the 1974–75 Kentucky Colonels, and was named to the 1975 ABA All-Defense Team.  In his ABA/NBA career, he tallied 8,482 total points, 5,560 total rebounds and 1,446 total assists.

His brothers Caldwell Jones, Charles Jones and Major Jones all played in the NBA.

References

External links
Career statistics at basketball-reference.com
Profile at Remember the ABA

1947 births
Living people
African-American basketball players
Albany State Golden Rams men's basketball players
American men's basketball players
Basketball players from Arkansas
Buffalo Braves players
Indiana Pacers draft picks
Indiana Pacers players
Kentucky Colonels players
Los Angeles Lakers draft picks
Memphis Pros players
Memphis Tams players
Miami Floridians draft picks
Miami Floridians players
People from McGehee, Arkansas
Small forwards
21st-century African-American people
20th-century African-American sportspeople